YL v Birmingham CC (UKHL 27) is a UK constitutional law case, concerning judicial review.

Facts
YL claimed that Southern Cross Ltd, a large private company running nursing homes in Birmingham, violated EHCR Article 8 and the human rights of an elderly resident by giving her only 28 days' notice to leave after a family disagreement. Southern Cross had been paid to care for residents in Birmingham City, with families contributing to the cost.

Judgment
Even though most residents were placed in the nursing homes by local authorities under a contract with the company, this did not make the company a public authority under HRA 1998 s 6.

Lord Scott said the following:

See also
United Kingdom constitutional law
R (Weaver) v London and Quadrant Housing Trust [2009] EWCA Civ 587

Notes

References

United Kingdom constitutional case law